On January 1, 1818, a special election was held in  to fill a vacancy left by the death of Representative-elect Alexander McMillan (F) before the 15th Congress had assembled.

Election results

Stewart took his seat on January 26

See also
 List of special elections to the United States House of Representatives
 1818 and 1819 United States House of Representatives elections
 List of United States representatives from North Carolina

References

1818 07
North Carolina 1818 07
North Carolina 07
North Carolina 07
United States House of Representatives 07
United States House of Representatives 1818 07